Syreeta Wright (1946–2004) was an American singer-songwriter.

Syreeta may also refer to:
 Syreeta (1972 album), by Syreeta Wright
 Syreeta (1980 album), by Syreeta Wright]

People with the given name
 Syreeta van Amelsvoort, Dutch Paralympic swimmer